Hoser is a derogatory slang term originating from Canada and used primarily by those imitating Canadians.

Hoser may also refer to:

People
Henryk Hoser, bishop of the Roman Catholic Diocese of Warszawa-Praga
Raymond Hoser, Australian herpetologist and snake catcher

Media
Hoser, an album by Seaway (2013)